The Hawaiian Historical Society, established in 1892, is a private non-profit organized by a group of prominent citizens dedicated to preserving historical materials, presenting public lectures, and publishing scholarly research on Hawaiian history. The first president was Charles Reed Bishop, who founded the Kamehameha Schools in honor of his wife Princess Bernice Pauahi Bishop. Governor Sanford B. Dole also served as President of the Society. Early members included historians Nathaniel Bright Emerson and Ralph Simpson Kuykendall.

In one of the Society's first meetings, on February 24, 1892,  Queen Lili‘uokalani was voted Patron of the Society.

The Society publishes books and the Hawaiian Journal of History. This annual publication is the longest published peer-reviewed journal focusing on the history of both pre- and post-contact Hawai'i. The Society's Library, located at the Hawaiian Mission Houses Historic Site and Archives, contains a collection of photos, newspapers, magazines, journals, books, pamphlets, and manuscripts made available to scholars and the public. For example, in 1974, the journal published a retrospective on the 1874 election of King Kalākaua and the ensuing Honolulu Courthouse riot including letters with eyewitness accounts.

As a leading organization studying the history of Hawai'i, the Society presents free public lectures on a regular basis. Its speakers and authors are often featured in the media, and on Facebook and Tumblr.

External links
The Society's web site
The Hawaiian Journal of History online
The Society's Annual Reports, which include academic papers

References

State historical societies of the United States
History of Hawaii
Non-profit organizations based in Hawaii
1892 establishments in Hawaii
Organizations established in 1892